The Central District of Abhar County is in Zanjan province, Iran. At the National Census in 2006, its population was 130,278 in 34,051 households. The following census in 2011 counted 140,584 people in 41,116 households. At the latest census in 2016, the district had 151,528 inhabitants in 47,329 households.

References 

Abhar County

Districts of Zanjan Province

Populated places in Zanjan Province

Populated places in Abhar County